Tyrone Sally (born January 25, 1982) is an American retired basketball player.RealGM.com profile After playing college basketball for West Virginia, he played professionally in the NBA D-League and Europe. While playing with Rotterdam Basketbal, he was the DBL top scorer in the 2011–12 season. He now is the Head Basketball Coach at Alexandria City High School in Alexandria, VA.

Honors and titles

Club
Oberwart Gunners
Austrian Basketball Bundesliga: 2010–11

References

External links
Basketball Reference profile
ProBallers.com profile
West Virginia Mountaineers bio

1982 births
Living people
American expatriate basketball people in Austria
American expatriate basketball people in Luxembourg
American expatriate basketball people in the Netherlands
American men's basketball players
Arkansas RimRockers players
Basketball players from Virginia
BSC Fürstenfeld Panthers players
Dutch Basketball League players
Feyenoord Basketball players
Leuven Bears players
Musel Pikes players
Oberwart Gunners players
People from Chesterfield, Virginia
Roanoke Dazzle players
Small forwards
West-Brabant Giants players
West Virginia Mountaineers men's basketball players